SSV Oliver Hazard Perry is a tall ship operated by Oliver Hazard Perry Rhode Island (OHPRI) a grass-roots nonprofit based in Newport, Rhode Island.  The ship is named after the American Commodore Oliver Hazard Perry (1785–1819), the hero of the naval Battle of Lake Erie (1813).

Description 
It measures , and is a three-masted square-rigged vessel, making it the largest privately owned tall ship and largest civilian sail training vessel in the United States. The SSV Oliver Hazard Perry sails as Rhode Island’s Official Sailing School Vessel and "good will ambassador" for the state, as well as a "floating classroom". It teaches students STEAM (Science, Technology, Engineering, Arts and Mathematics) lessons while applying it to the practical activities they learn how to do on the ship. It is being financed through a tax exempt 501(c)(3) charitable foundation, and public subscription.

The ship, when acquired by the Rhode Island trust for $325,000, was a  steel hull, built by an organization in Ontario. It had cost almost $3 million to build. However the Canadian group derailed before the ship could be completed, leaving the Rhode Islanders at liberty to purchase it. The Canadians had intended it to be a replica of the 20-gun British ship  (1813) (captured by the flotilla commanded by Commodore Perry; not the six gun sloop  (1816) destroyed by Lieutenant Jesse D. Elliott in the War of 1812).

On July 16, 2015, the Perry set sail for the first time on a voyage to Portland, ME. During that voyage it made a stop in Provincetown, MA. While in Maine the Perry participated in the parade of sail during the 2015 Portland Tall Ships festival. The ship also made a visit to New London, CT, for the 2015 Connecticut Maritime Heritage Festival.

On October 15, 2017, the ship lost power while leaving the Newport, RI seafood festival. It drifted into several boats and sat grounded overnight in Newport Harbor. An on scene eye witness said power was not lost till grounding (sucking mud). What was lost was control in high wind. After repairs were made, the ship set sail again, fulfilling its mission as an educational vessel, hosting students from high schools, the United States Naval Sea Cadet Corps (USNSCC), and the Naval Academy Prep School.

References

External links
 
 Oliver Hazard Perry Rhode Island Educational Foundation

2013 ships
Individual sailing vessels
Ships built in Rhode Island
Three-masted ships